In United States politics, the "iron triangle" comprises the policy-making relationship among the congressional committees, the bureaucracy, and interest groups, as described in 1981 by Gordon Adams. Earlier mentions of this ‘iron triangle’ concept are in a 1956 Congressional Quarterly Weekly Report as, “Iron triangle: Clout, background, and outlook” and “Chinks in the Iron Triangle?”

Central assumption 
Central to the concept of an iron triangle is the assumption that bureaucratic agencies, as political entities, seek to create and consolidate their own power base.

In this view an agency's (such as State-owned enterprises of the United States, Independent agencies of the United States government or Regulatory agency) power is determined by its constituency, not by its consumers. (For these purposes, "constituents" are politically active members sharing a common interest or goal; consumers are the expected recipients of goods or services provided by a governmental bureaucracy and often are identified in an agency's written goals or mission statement.)

Apparent bureaucratic dysfunction may be attributable to the alliances formed between the agency and its constituency. The official goals of an agency may appear to be thwarted or ignored altogether, at the expense of the citizenry it is designed to serve.

Cultivation of constituency 
The need of a bureaucracy for a constituency sometimes leads to an agency's cultivation of a particular clientele. An agency may seek out those groups (within its policy jurisdiction) that might make the best allies and give it the most power (civic intelligence to act on their collective social capital) within the political arena.

Often, especially in a low-level bureaucracy, the consumers (the declared beneficiaries of an agency's services) do not qualify as power brokers and thus, are perceived as poor constituents. Governments are instituted among Men, deriving their just powers from the consent of the governed. Large segments of the public have diffused interests, seldom vote, may be rarely  or poorly organized and difficult to mobilize, and often, are lacking in resources or financial muscle.

Private or special interest groups such as 501(c) organizations and 527 organizations, on the other hand, possess considerable power as they tend to be well-organized, have plenty of resources, are easily mobilized, and are extremely active in political affairs, through voting, campaign contributions, and lobbying, as well as proposing legislation themselves.

Thus, it may be in an agency's interest to switch its focus from its officially designated consumers to a carefully selected clientele of constituents who will aid the agency in its quest for greater political influence.

Dynamics 

In the United States, power is exercised in the Congress, and, particularly, in congressional committees and subcommittees. By aligning itself with selected constituencies, an agency may be able to affect policy outcomes directly in these committees and subcommittees. This is where an iron triangle may manifest itself.

The image above displays the concept.

 At one corner of the triangle are interest groups (constituencies) and non-state actors. These are the powerful interest groups that influence Congressional votes in their favor and can sufficiently influence the re-election of a member of Congress in return for support of their programs.
 At another corner sit members of Congress who also seek to align themselves with a constituency for political and electoral support. These congressional members support legislation that advances an interest group's agenda.
 Occupying the third corner of the triangle are bureaucrats, who often are pressured by the same powerful interest groups their agency is designated to regulate, and in some cases have close ties to the regulated industry.

The result is a three-way, stable alliance that sometimes is called a "sub-government" because of its durability, impregnability, and power to determine policy.
 
An iron triangle relationship can result in regulatory capture, the passing of very narrow, pork-barrel policies that benefit a small segment of the population. The interests of the agency's constituency (the interest groups) are met, while the needs of consumers (which may be the general public) are passed over.

That public administration may result in benefiting a small segment of the public in this way, may be viewed as problematic for the popular concept of democracy if the general welfare of all citizens is sacrificed for very specific interests. This is especially so if the passed legislation neglects or reverses the original purpose for which the agency was established. The Regulatory Capture Prevention Act of 2011 - Establishes the Office of Regulatory Integrity in the Office of Management and Budget (OMB), requires investigation when (1) agency action or inaction that fails to advance the mission of the agency or is otherwise inimical to the public interest; (2) regulation, licensing, adjudication, grants, or other agency action that favors a limited number of economic interests or is otherwise inimical to the public interest; (3) enforcement priorities that are not reasonably calculated to accomplish regulatory goals; and (4) a loss of confidence in the integrity of the regulatory process.

Some maintain to the contrary, that such arrangements are natural outgrowths of, and not discordant with, the democratic process, since they frequently involve a majority block of voters implementing their will—through their elected representatives in government.

On January 27, 2011, FBI Director Robert Mueller used "iron triangles" to refer to "organized criminals, corrupt government officials, and business leaders" which he said "pose a significant national security threat".

See also

Iron law of oligarchy
Issue Network
Policy
Polity
Policy analysis
Public choice theory
Regulatory capture
Revolving door (politics)
Military–industrial–congressional complex
Project management triangle also called Iron Triangle
Advocacy group
Administrative Procedure Act (United States)

References

Bibliography 
 Gordon Adams. The Iron Triangle: The Politics of Defense Contracting, Council on Economic Priorities, New York, 1981. 
 Graham T. Allison, Philip Zelikow; Essence of Decision: Explaining the Cuban Missile Crisis, Pearson Longman;  (2nd edition, 1999)
 Dan Briody. The Iron Triangle: Inside the Secret World of the Carlyle Group, Wiley, New York, Chichester, 2004,. 
 Peter Gemma, Op/Ed: "Iron Triangle" Rules Washington, USA Today, December 1988, Retrieved May 23, 2016 
 Hugh Heclo; Issue Networks and the Executive Establishment
 Jack H. Knott, Gary J. Miller; Reforming Bureaucracy; Prentice-Hall;  (1st edition, 1987)
 Francis E. Rourke; Bureaucracy, Politics, and Public Policy Harpercollins;  (3rd edition, 1984)
 Hedrick Smith; The Power Game: How Washington Really Works
 Ralph Pulitzer, Charles H. Grasty

Conflict of interest
Lobbying in the United States
Military–industrial complex
Political corruption in the United States
Political science theories